The Secretary-General of the Nordic Council is the head of the Nordic Council Secretariat, one of the principal organs of the Nordic Council. The Nordic parliamentary co-operation, the Nordic Council, is led by the Secretary General in Copenhagen.

The Secretary General together with the Council Secretariat prepares the business procedures which are then processed by the Nordic Council. Preparations are made in consultation and collaboration with the Secretariat for the Nordic Council's national delegations and the party groups. The Secretary General submits reports to the Nordic Council's executive body, the Presidium, which is led by the President of the Nordic Council. The agenda for the Presidium's meetings is drawn up together with the Nordic Council's president.

On 1 February 2021 Kristina Háfoss of the Faroe Islands became the new Secretary-General.

List of Secretaries-General

See also

 Nordic Council
 Nordic countries

References

External links 
 Official website

Nordic Council
Nordic countries
Nordic politics